DJ Culture is the second studio album by German musical duo Blank & Jones. It was released in 2000.

Track listing
"A New Culture Is Born" – 3:14
"The Nightfly" – 7:21
"La Luna" – 5:45
"DJ Culture" – 6:07
"Sundowner" – 5:15
"Sound of Machines" – 5:15
"The Blue Sky" – 6:38
"Waste Your Youth" – 4:38
"Mindcrasher" – 7:30
"The Nightfly (Break Reprise)" – 5:32
"The Blue Sky (Short)" – 3:36
"DJ Culture (Short)" – 3:06
"The Nightfly (Short)" – 3:53
"Sound of Machines (Short)" – 3:01

Blank & Jones albums
2000 albums